Glen Warwick Jackson (born 23 October 1975 in Feilding, New Zealand) is a professional full-time referee for New Zealand Rugby. Jackson is also a former New Zealand rugby union player. During his playing career, he was a first five-eighth. Domestically, he represented Bay of Plenty and Waikato in the NPC and the Saracens in the UK's Guinness Premiership. His strong performances saw him named in the Chiefs squad for the 1999 Super Rugby season and had international experience as well with New Zealand Māori (now known as the Māori All Blacks) and the Barbarians.

Playing career
Jackson was part of the 2004 Bay of Plenty Steamers team when they won the Ranfurly Shield.

He made his debut for the Chiefs in the opening round of the 1999 Super 12 season. Jackson made his final appearance for the Chiefs in a 2004 Super 12 semi-final defeat to the Brumbies. Jackson was a member of the New Zealand Māori side that won the 2004 Churchill Cup. He signed for Saracens in 2004.

In 2007 he was voted The Professional Rugby Players' Association player of the year after being leading points scorer in the 2006–07 Guinness Premiership.

In 2009 he played for the Barbarians. Jackson played his final game for Saracens against Leicester Tigers in the final of the 2009–10 Guinness Premiership.

Refereeing career
In 2010 Jackson retired to become a professional referee in his native New Zealand. He was fast-tracked into the professional rugby ranks by Lyndon Bray, then the head of referees for the New Zealand Rugby Union (now known as New Zealand Rugby) and later in the same role with SANZAAR, organiser of Super Rugby and The Rugby Championship (formerly the Tri Nations). Within a year of Jackson's return to New Zealand, he went from refereeing provincial rugby games in the Heartland Championship to officiating in the ITM Cup at the top provincial level to being an assistant referee in Super Rugby competition. By the end of the 2011 Super Rugby season, he had worked his first match as referee in that competition, having presided over the Hurricanes−Western Force match on 27 May. Shortly after the end of that season, he made his international officiating debut as television match official for the Bledisloe Cup Test between New Zealand and Australia on 6 August. On 15 February 2015 he made his Six Nations refereeing debut when he took charge of the Scotland-Wales match at Murrayfield. Jackson was the first New Zealander to play and referee 100 first class fixtures when he took charge of the Argentina v South Africa match on 15 August 2015. He retired as a referee after he was not selected for the 2019 Rugby World Cup.

Coaching career
In September 2020, Jackson was appointed as one of the assistants to Fiji head coach Vern Cotter.

References

External links
Saracens profile
Player statistics from scrum.com
Player profile from allblacks.com

1975 births
Barbarian F.C. players
Bay of Plenty rugby union players
Chiefs (rugby union) players
Living people
Ngāi Tahu people
Māori All Blacks players
New Zealand rugby union players
New Zealand rugby union referees
New Zealand expatriate sportspeople in England
Rugby union fly-halves
Saracens F.C. players
People educated at Otumoetai College
People from Feilding
Super Rugby referees
The Rugby Championship referees
Six Nations Championship referees